"Paga de Solteiro Feliz" is a song by the Brazilian duo Simone & Simaria featuring the Brazilian DJ Alok. The song was released on January 5, 2018, produced by Alok, exploring the mix of sertanejo, principal genre of Simone & Simaria, with electronic music, genre of Alok.

Charts

References

2018 singles
Alok (DJ) songs
2018 songs